Nijs is a Dutch patronymic surname originating from the given name "Nijs", a short form of Denijs (Denis). An alternative spelling is Nys. People with this name include:

Surname
Adriaan Nijs (1683–1771), Flemish sculptor
Annette Nijs (born 1961), Dutch politician
 (born 1963), Belgian composer and conductor
Lenie de Nijs (born 1939), Dutch swimmer
Philips Alexander Nijs (1724–1805), Flemish sculptor
Pierre Nijs (1890 –1939), Belgian water polo player 
Pieter Nijs (1624–1681), Dutch painter
Suzanne Nijs (1897–1983), Dutch-Belgian sculptor

Given name
Nijs Korevaar (1927–2016), Dutch water polo player

See also
 De Nijs (surname)
 Nijssen (surname)
 Sven Nys (born 1976), Belgian cyclo-cross racer sometimes spelled Sven Nijs

References

Dutch-language surnames
Patronymic surnames